J. F. Barbour III (born September 7, 1940) is a politician in the U.S. state of Mississippi. In 1968, he was elected as an independent (although closely affiliated with the Republican party) as mayor of Yazoo City, Mississippi. It was the first time that a non-Democrat held the post since Reconstruction.

Background
Jeptha Fowlkes "Jeppie" Barbour III was born on September 7, 1940 in Yazoo City, Mississippi, the eldest child of Jeptha Fowlkes, Jr. and Grace LeFlore (Johnson) Barbour. His father was a judge who died when he was a child. His mother served as a notary public and gave him the oath of office when her son was elected mayor. Jeppie is the older brother of former Mississippi governor Haley Barbour.

Career
In 1968, Barbour became one of the youngest mayors in the history of Yazoo City, when he was elected at age 27. Although he was elected as an independent, Barbour was closely aligned with the Republican Party, having previously served as finance chairman for the Yazoo County GOP.

In 1972, Barbour ran for re-election as a Republican. Despite a record turn-out, Barbour lost to Floyd E. Johnson, a Democrat. Eugene Ward, an African-American, running as Independent, finished a close third behind Barbour.

After he left office, Barbour became the Mississippi state director of FHA.

References

1940 births
American Presbyterians
Christians from Mississippi
Living people
People from Yazoo City, Mississippi
Mississippi Republicans
Mayors of places in Mississippi
University of Mississippi alumni
20th-century American politicians